The Hottest Night of the Year is the seventeenth studio album by Canadian country pop artist Anne Murray. It was released by Capitol Records in 1982. The album reached #29 on Billboard's Country albums chart and peaked at #90 on the Billboard Pop albums chart.  Its US sales were estimated at approximately 200,000 copies.

The album's first single, a cover of the 1961 Bruce Channel hit "Hey! Baby" was a U.S. country top-ten single, reaching number 7; the following up single, "Somebody's Always Saying Goodbye", also peaked at number 7 on the country singles chart.  Both singles topped the Canadian Country singles charts.

Track listing

Personnel 
 Anne Murray – lead vocals, backing vocals 
 Brian Whitcomb – electric piano (1), acoustic piano (2, 8, 9)
 Lance Ong – synthesizers (1, 2)
 Doug Riley – synthesizers (1), organ (3), keyboards (4-7, 10)
 Bobby Ogdin – acoustic piano (3)
 Dennis Burnside – electric piano (3)
 Mike "Pepe" Francis – electric guitar (1, 2, 8), guitars (4, 6, 7, 10)
 John Hug – electric guitar (1, 2, 8, 9), acoustic guitar (8)
 Fred Tackett – acoustic guitar (1, 2, 8, 9)
 Rafe Van Hoy – acoustic guitar (3)
 Paul Worley – acoustic guitar (3), electric guitar (3)
 Bob Mann – guitars (4-7, 10)
 Brian Russell – guitars (5)
 Sonny Garrish – steel guitar (3)
 Ben Mink – mandolin (10), fiddle (10)
 Leland Sklar – bass (1, 2, 8, 9)
 Joe Osborn – bass (3)
 Tom Szczesniak – bass (4-7, 10)
 Mike Botts – drums (1, 2, 8, 9)
 Eddie Bayers – drums (3)
 Barry Keane – drums (4-7, 10)
 Steve Forman – percussion (1, 2, 8)
 Dick Smith – percussion (1, 2, 4, 6, 7, 8)
 Earl Seymour – baritone saxophone (6)
 Vern Dorge – tenor saxophone (6)
 Butch Wantanabe – trombone (6)
 Guido Basso – trumpet (6)
 Charlie Gray – trumpet (6)
 Peter Cardinali – horn arrangements and conductor (6)
 Rick Wilkins – string arrangements and conductor (3, 4, 10)
 Alan Broadbent – string arrangements and conductor (8, 9)
 Glenn Grab – string contractor (3, 4, 8, 9, 10)
 Bill Richards – string contractor (3, 4, 8, 9, 10)
 Bruce Murray – backing vocals 
 Deborah Schaal Greimann – backing vocals 
 Balmur Ltd. – executive producer 
 Jim Ed Norman – producer 
 Ken Friesen – recording, mixing 
 Marshall Morgan – recording 
 Eric Prestidge – recording 
 Tom Henderson – recording assistant 
 Ben Rodgers – recording assistant 
 John Rosenthal – recording assistant 
 Ken Perry – mastering at Capitol Mastering (Hollywood, California)
 Paul Cade – art direction, design, illustration
 Bob Karman – illustration
 Bill King – photography 
 Ted Larson – lettering 
 George Abbott – make-up artist
 Shelly Yakimov – hair stylist

Chart performance

References

1982 albums
Anne Murray albums
Capitol Records albums
Albums produced by Jim Ed Norman